Senshō Murakami (村上専精, 1 May 1851 – 31 October 1929) was a Meiji period Buddhist scholar and Jodo Shinshu priest. He famously introduced Western scholarship on Buddhism for Japan, and because of this was forced to resign from Japanese Buddhist priesthood. However, ten years later he was reinstated into the priesthood. He belonged to the Ōtani-ha branch of Shin Buddhism.

His most notable work was 『仏教統一論』, (Discourse on Buddhist Unity), which argued that Japanese Mahayana texts were not the true teachings of Buddha. While he had explained this argument before in a history text, this book, written more in the style of polemic, became famous in intellectual circles. It was also called 『大乗非仏説論』 which has been translated simply as "The Theory That Mahayana Is Not the Buddha's Teachings". However, Murakami believed that Mahayana was nonetheless transcendental truth.

References

External links
 

Japanese Buddhist clergy
1851 births
1929 deaths
Jōdo Shinshū Buddhist priests
Japanese scholars of Buddhism